The 2009–10 Pittsburgh Panthers men's basketball team represented the University of Pittsburgh in the 2009–10 NCAA Division I men's basketball season. Their Head Coach was Jamie Dixon, who was in his 7th year as head coach at Pittsburgh and 11th overall at the University. The team played its home games in the Petersen Events Center in Pittsburgh, Pennsylvania and were members of the Big East Conference. They finished the season 25–9, 13–5 in Big East play and lost in the quarterfinals of the 2010 Big East men's basketball tournament. They received an at–large bid to the 2010 NCAA Division I men's basketball tournament, earning a 3 seed in the West Region. They defeated 14 seed Oakland in the first round before losing to 6 seed and AP No. 25 Xavier in the second round.

Outlook 
The  Pittsburgh Panthers advanced to last season's NCAA Elite Eight. The team lost four starters, including NBA draft selections Sam Young and DeJuan Blair, along with point guard Levance Fields and forward/center Tyrell Biggs. Guard Jermaine Dixon was the only returning starter from last season's squad while projected starter Gilbert Brown was suspended for the fall semester for academic reasons, although he reenrolled and returned to the team in December. Four freshman joined the Panthers, including McDonald's High School All-American Dante Taylor.  Also new to the team was senior guard Chase Adams, a transfer from Centenary College of Louisiana. The Panthers' roster was the most inexperienced in the Big East, with six freshmen, two sophomores and only two seniors, and when Dixon went down with a foot injury in the offseason, ruling him out until well into December, the remaining roster had a total of one career start.

The Panthers were selected to finish 9th in the Big East by the Big East coaches during their conference media day.

Coaching staff

Recruiting

Roster 

*Suspended for the fall semester for academic reasons, but re-enrolled and returned to the team in December.

Schedule 

|-
!colspan=9 style="background:#091C44; color:#CEC499;" | Exhibition

|-
!colspan=9 style="background:#091C44; color:#CEC499;" | Regular season

|-
!colspan=9 style="background:#091C44; color:#CEC499;" | Big East tournament 

|-
!colspan=9 style="background:#091C44; color:#CEC499;" | NCAA tournament

|-

Rankings

Accomplishments
 Pitt achieved a school record ninth straight 20-win season and a school record ninth straight season with 10 wins in the Big East Conference.
 Sophomore guard Ashton Gibbs was named Second-Team All-Big East.
 Ashton Gibbs was named the Big East's most improved player.
Ninth straight NCAA Tournament appearance.

References

Pittsburgh Panthers
Pittsburgh Panthers men's basketball seasons
Pittsburgh Panthers
Pittsburgh Pan
Pittsburgh Pan